Theatre of Silence could refer to the following:
 Teatro del Silenzio, an Italian amphitheatre
 Theatre of Silence : The Lost Soul of Football, an association football book by Matthew Bazell